Altona is an unincorporated community in northern Bates County, in the U.S. state of Missouri. The community is on Missouri Route Z just north of Missouri route 18 and approximately 5.5 miles east of Adrian.

History
Altona was platted in 1860, and named after Altoona, Pennsylvania, the native home of a first settler. A post office called Altona was established in 1868, and remained in operation until 1920.

In 1925, Altona had 11 inhabitants.

References

Unincorporated communities in Bates County, Missouri
Unincorporated communities in Missouri